Shree Swaminarayan Mandir, Oldham is a Swaminarayan Hindu temple in Oldham, England. It became the third Swaminarayan temple to open in the United Kingdom under the NarNarayan Dev Gadi of the Swaminarayan Sampraday on 22 October 1977.

30th Anniversary
In 2007 over 2,500 people, including the mayor of Oldham, celebrated the temple's thirtieth anniversary.

40th Anniversary
End of July 2017 to start of August 2017

References

Swaminarayan temples
Hindu temples in England
Buildings and structures in Oldham
Religious buildings and structures in Greater Manchester